Cappadocia Vocational College (CVC) (in Turkish, Kapadokya Meslek Yüksekokulu KMYO) was founded in 2005 by Ilke Education and Welfare Foundation (İlke Eğitim ve Sağlık Vakfı) and has become an important and successful model of vocational higher education in Turkey. The programs of the college were established in accordance with regional development programs as Cappadocia programs, civil aviation programs and health programs. The current University dean is Prof. Dr. Nuran Tezcan, an expert of Turkish literature and Diwan poetry.

Now, with its 25 programs the college has two campuses, one in Cappadocia – Nevşehir and the other, at Istanbul Sabiha Gökçen Airport.

History 
Starting in 2005-2006 academic year with five programs designed to meet the regional development targets, Cappadocia Vocational College currently continues its educational activities in 25 associate degree programs in two campuses, in Cappadocia and at Sabiha Gökçen Airport respectively.

Since 2009, focusing on the area of civil aviation, the college has introduced and opened Hot Air Balloon Piloting, Aircraft Technology, Civil Aviation Management in English, Civil Aviation Cabin Services and Flight Dispatcher programs and established a second campus at Sabiha Gökçen International Airport in 2011 with the support of Defense Industry Undersecretariat in addition to the trainings and education delivered at Cappadocia campus.

In 2012, parallel to the development targets of the health sector and the demand for qualified workforce in this area, the College has concentrated on health programs. Consequently, in 2011-2012 academic year, Child Development program; in 2012-2013 academic year Oral and Dental Care, Operating Room Services, Dialysis, Physiotherapy and Medical Imaging Techniques were established. The following academic year, Anesthesia, Electroneurophysiology, First and Emergency Aid, Audiometry, Opticianry programs; then, in 2014-2015 academic year, Medical Laboratory Techniques, Health Tourism Management, Social Services and Pathology Laboratory Techniques programs were started. Finally, in 2015-2016 academic year Dental Prosthetics Technology program was included among the others.

In 2014, fully equipped training areas were formed to carry out the practical trainings required for First and Emergency Aid, Medical Imaging Techniques, Operating Room Services, Dialysis, Audiometry, Opticianry programs. Furthermore, four centers were established in the same year under the names of Oral and Dental Care Application and Research Center, Child Development Application and Research Center, Physical Therapy and Wellness Application and Research Center and Continuous Education Center to support the practical training of the programs in Cappadocia Vocational College.

The Distance Education Unit was established in 2013, and started to enrol Tourist Guidance program students in 2014-2015 academic year, and Child Development program students the following year.

Another program was added in 2015-2016 year, namely associate degree justice program, in the area of law.

Studies on hot air balloon have been going on under the roof of Hot Air Balloon and Airship Application and Research Centre, opened in December 1, 2016.

Programs

Civil aviation programs 
 Aircraft Technology (English)
 Civil Aviation Cabin Services
 Civil Aviation Transportation Management (Turkish/English)
 Flight Dispatcher (English)

Health programs 
 Anesthesia
 Audiometry
 Child Development (Formal / Distance Education)
 Dental Prosthetics Technology
 Dialysis (Turkish/English)
 Electroneurophysiology
 First and Emergency Aid
 Health Tourism Management
 Medical Imaging Techniques
 Medical Laboratory Techniques
 Operating Room Services
 Opticianry
 Oral and Dental Care
 Physiotherapy
 Pathology Laboratory Techniques
 Social Services

Law programs 
 Justice

Cappadocia programs 
 Architectural Restoration
 Culinary Arts
 Horse and Horse Training
 Tourist Guidance  (Formal / Distance Education)

References

External links 

Universities and colleges in Turkey